Palaegambrium or Palaigambrion ('Old Gambrium') was a town of ancient Aeolis, close to Pergamum. Palaegambrium is first mentioned in the Hellenica of Xenophon which gives knowledge about the region in 399 BCE. At that time the ruler of the city, as well as of Gambrium, was Gorgion, son of Gongylos.

Its site is unlocated.

References

Populated places in ancient Aeolis
Former populated places in Turkey
Lost ancient cities and towns